CEESA (Central and Eastern European Schools Association) is an association of international schools in Central and Eastern Europe. The member schools are all sponsored by the United States Department of State, Office of Overseas Schools.

Full Member Schools 
 Quality Schools International (a group of schools in Europe and Asia, with headquarters in Slovenia)
 International School of Belgrade
 International School of Prague
 Anglo-American School of Moscow
 Anglo-American School of St. Petersburg
 American International School of Bucharest
 American International School of Budapest
 Anglo-American School of Sofia
 International School of Estonia
 Tashkent International School
 International School of Helsinki
 American International School of Vienna
 Istanbul International Community School
 American International School of Vilnius
 International School of Krakow
 American School of Warsaw
 International School of Latvia
 American International School of Zagreb
Pechersk School International, Kyiv, Ukraine
 Kyiv International School http://kis.net.ua/site/
 Istanbul International Community School
 The International School of Azerbaijan
 Nova International Schools

Competitions 
CEESA regularly organizes annual competitions between member schools. These competitions in sports are: middle school robotics, high school robotics, middle school soccer (football), high school soccer (football), volleyball, tennis, softball, swimming, cross-country, and basketball. In educational competitions there is speech and debate, middle school mathcounts, high school mathcounts, middle school knowledge bowl, and high school knowledge Bowl.

Conferences 
CEESA sponsors an annual conference for teachers and staff at US-sponsored schools in Central and Eastern Europe.  The 2007 conference is planned for Prague; the 2008 conference for Istanbul.

Divisions 
There are three divisions in CEESA. The first and biggest division is the Red Division. The schools in this division are Budapest, Bucharest, Istanbul, Kiev, Moscow, Prague, and Warsaw. These schools have 700 students and above. The second division is the Blue Division. The schools in this division are Belgrade, Helsinki, Latvia, Nova Skopje, Psi, Sofia, and Azerbaijan. These schools have from 400-600 students. The third and smallest school is the Green division. The schools in this division are Estonia, Krkow, Tirana, Vilnius, Zagreb, and Cyprus. These schools have less than 400 students.

External links 
CEESA Home Page

International school associations